Happy New Year is an EP released by the Violent Femmes for Record Store Day on April 18, 2015. It was the first recording of original songs by the band in 15 years. The EP was released on 12-inch, 180-gram, champagne-colored vinyl, and later made available for digital download on June 2, 2015

Track listing

Personnel 
 Gordon Gano – vocals, guitar
 Brian Ritchie – acoustic bass guitar, vocals
 Brian Viglione – snare drum, tranceaphone, percussion, vocals
 John Sparrow – Cajon
 Jeff Hamilton – Dobro, mandolin, ukulele, cabasa, vocals
 Blaise Garza – Bass saxophone, piano

References

Violent Femmes albums
2015 EPs